The Meaning of Happy was the first and only album released in 2006 by the pop group Same Same.

Track listing
 "Supermodel" (Bob Moffatt, Clint Moffatt, Paul Cimolini) – 3:05
 "City Lights" (B. Moffatt, C. Moffatt) – 3:58
 "Without You" (Featuring Lovi Poe) (B. Moffatt, C. Moffatt, Warut Rintranukul) – 3:41
 "Downtown" (B. Moffatt, C. Moffatt) – 3:06
 "I'm Still in Love with You" (B. Moffatt, C. Moffatt) – 4:21
 "Love Isn't" (B. Moffatt, C. Moffatt) – 4:08
 "Strange Lover" (B. Moffatt, C. Moffatt) – 4:51
 "Hearts Collide" (B. Moffatt, C. Moffatt, Prawech Nopnirapath) – 4:17
 "The Meaning of Happy" (B. Moffatt, C. Moffatt) – 3:21
 "Stay" (B. Moffatt, C. Moffatt, P. Nopnirapath) – 4:03
 "I Waited Too Long" (B. Moffatt, C. Moffatt) – 4:50
 "Tell Me" (B. Moffatt, C. Moffatt, W. Rintranukul) – 4:09
 "Farang Ja" (Featuring Arpaporn) (B. Moffatt, C. Moffatt, Arpaporn) – 4:55
 "Without You" (Featuring Nui) (B. Moffatt, C. Moffatt, W. Rintranukul, Lovely Lina) – 3:53
 "Supermodel" (Asian Embassy Remix) (B. Moffatt, C. Moffatt, P. Cimolini) – 3:25
 "City Lights" (Mr. Z Trance Remix) (B. Moffatt, C. Moffatt) – 5:39
 "Supermodel" (Turtle Beat Masala Remix) (B. Moffatt, C. Moffatt, P. Cimolini) – 3:04

Credits
Suthiti Chaisamut – Drum Technician
Chonrada Chayachinda – A&R Coordinator
Alex Clayton – Photography
Phil Demetro – Mastering
Gerald Dibbayawan – Managing Director, Executive Producer
Amornrat Homhoul – A&R Director
Jennita Itthi-angkul – Styling
Jettapol Khan – Additional Mastering
Petcharat Lapthananchaiwong – Marketing Manager
Bob Moffatt – drums, percussion, Lead and Background vocals, Co-producer, Engineering, Pro Tools Editing
Clint Moffatt – Bass, Lead and Background Vocals, Co-producer
Frank Moffatt – Executive Producer
Prawech Nopnirapath – acoustic guitar, Electric Guitar, Co-producer
Napatsorn Pongvijit – Creative Manager
Suriya Puengthongthai – Acoustic Guitar, Electric Guitar
Warut Rintranukul – Keyboard, Programming, Producer, Engineering, Mixing
Blue Satittammonoon – A&R Executive
Apirat Techavachara – A&R Coordinator
Saharat Vanchompoo – Marketing Director

Additional information
Recorded and mixed at  Polarbear Studio and Sevendogs' Homebase in Bangkok, Thailand
"Supermodel" (Asian Embassy Remix) was Re-mixed by Michael Piroon of Asian Embassy
"City Lights" (Trance Remix) was Re-mixed by Zomkiat Ariyachaipanich (Mr. Z)

External links
Lyrics

2006 debut albums